John Edward Chambers (born 23 October 1971) is an English cricketer.  Chambers is a right-handed batsman who bowls right-arm medium-fast.  He was born in Barking, London.and is now a primary school teacher

Chambers represented the Essex Cricket Board in a single List A match against the Sussex Cricket Board in the 1st round of the 2002 Cheltenham & Gloucester Trophy which was held in 2001.

He currently plays club cricket for Wanstead Cricket Club in the Essex Premier League.

References

External links
John Chambers at Cricinfo
John Chambers at CricketArchive

1971 births
Living people
People from Barking, London
Cricketers from Greater London
English cricketers
Essex Cricket Board cricketers